John William Corso (December 4, 1929 – October 9, 2019) was an American art director and production designer. He was nominated for an Academy Award in the category Best Art Direction for the film Coal Miner's Daughter. Corso was a native of Wabash, Indiana.

Selected filmography
 Coal Miner's Daughter (1980)

References

External links

2019 deaths
1929 births
American art directors
People from Wabash, Indiana